May White (1889 – 18 October 1979) was an American silent film actress. She worked as an actress with Essanay Studios in Niles, California, before leaving with Charlie Chaplin for Los Angeles.

Filmography
 A Countless Count (1915)
A Night in the Show (1915)
Burlesque on Carmen (1915)
The Beauty Hunters (1916)
The Count (1916)
The Adventurer (1917)
 The Mystery of No. 47 (1917)
The Kid (1921)

External links

References

American silent film actresses
20th-century American actresses
1889 births
1979 deaths